Polk Township is one of fourteen townships in Bremer County, Iowa, USA.  As of the 2010 census, its population was 922.

Geography
The hamlet of Horton is situated southeast of the intersection of 140th Street (State Route 188) and Easton Avenue. According to the USGS, Polk Township contains three cemeteries: Horton, Jackson and Willow Lawn.

References

External links
 US-Counties.com
 City-Data.com

Townships in Bremer County, Iowa
Waterloo – Cedar Falls metropolitan area
Townships in Iowa